Allen Goodings (7 May 192515 December 1992) was the tenth Bishop of Quebec.

He was educated at Sir George Williams University and ordained in 1959. After a curacy at Trinity Memorial Church, Montreal he held incumbencies at St Ignatius Montreal and The Ascension, Montreal. He was Dean of Quebec from 1969 until his appointment to the episcopate in 1977. He resigned his See in 1991.

References

1925 births
1992 deaths
Sir George Williams University alumni
Deans of Quebec
Anglican bishops of Quebec
20th-century Anglican Church of Canada bishops